Winton is a town and the county seat of Hertford County, North Carolina, United States. It is governed by the Town Council which consists of a Mayor and five Council members. The population was 769 at the 2010 census.

History
On September 19, 1862, Union soldiers under Colonel Rush C. Hawkins sacked and burned the town.

The C. S. Brown School Auditorium, Gray Gables, and King Parker House are listed on the National Register of Historic Places.

Geography
Winton is located at  (36.390023, -76.935780).

Demographics

2020 census

As of the 2020 United States census, there were 629 people, 291 households, and 192 families residing in the town.

2000 census
As of the census of 2000, there were 956 people, 373 households, and 252 families residing in the town. The population density was 1,180.6 people per square mile (455.7/km). There were 385 housing units at an average density of 475.4 per square mile (183.5/km). The racial makeup of the town was  67.99% African American, 27.62% White, 2.41% Native American, 0.84% from other races, 0.63% Asian, and 0.52% from two or more races. Hispanic or Latino of any race were 1.78% of the population.

There were 373 households, out of which 31.4% had children under the age of 18 living with them, 34.9% were married couples living together, 29.2% had a female householder with no husband present, and 32.2% were non-families. 28.7% of all households were made up of individuals, and 11.5% had someone living alone who was 65 years of age or older. The average household size was 2.37 and the average family size was 2.91.

In the town, the population was spread out, with 25.8% under the age of 18, 10.7% from 18 to 24, 26.7% from 25 to 44, 25.9% from 45 to 64, and 10.9% who were 65 years of age or older. The median age was 35 years. For every 100 females, there were 87.8 males. For every 100 females age 18 and over, there were 85.1 males.

The median income for a household in the town was $19,706, and the median income for a family was $21,838. Males had a median income of $21,875 compared to $17,059 for females. The per capita income for the town was $13,049. About 19.3% of families and 20.0% of the population were below the poverty line, including 23.7% of those under age 18 and 7.1% of those age 65 or over.

Winton and the surrounding area is the home of the Meherrin Indian Tribe. This state-recognized tribe has more than 900 members.

Government and infrastructure

Education
The Hertford County Public Schools system serves students in the area, many of whom attend Hertford County High School in Ahoskie. C. S. Brown High School STEM, and The Alternative Learning Program are located in Winton.

Notable person
 Sherman Jones, professional baseball player and Kansas politician

References

External links
  Alice Jones Nickens, "Winton's Calvin Scott Brown School", Roanoke-Chowan Website

Towns in Hertford County, North Carolina
Towns in North Carolina
County seats in North Carolina